Alexander Ardakov (born in Samara, Russia, formerly Kuybyshev) is a Russian professional pianist, graduate of the Moscow Conservatoire and prizewinner at the Viotti International competition in Italy (1984). Between 1981 and 1991 he played with the Moscow State Philharmonia. Since 1991, he has lived in London, working as Professor of Piano at Trinity College of Music, London.

He has performed for BBC Radio 3 and Classic FM, and made numerous CD recordings, including pieces by Chopin, Tchaikovsky, Mozart and Sergei Rachmaninoff - he has recorded Rachmaninoff's Second Piano Concerto with the Royal Philharmonic Orchestra, conducted by Sir Alexander Gibson.

External links
 Trinity College of Music: Biography
 Biography at the National Association of Youth Orchestras
 Concert Review
 BBC Radio 3

Year of birth missing (living people)
Living people
Russian classical pianists
Male classical pianists
Musicians from Samara, Russia
21st-century classical pianists
21st-century Russian male musicians